Digboi College, established in 1965, is a general degree college situated at Digboi, in Tinsukia district, Assam. This college is affiliated with the Dibrugarh University.

Departments
UG and PG

UG Courses as follows:

Science
Physics
Mathematics
Chemistry
Electronics
Computer Science
Information Technology
Botany
Zoology

Arts and Commerce
 Assamese
Hindi
 English
History
Education
Economics
Philosophy
Political Science
Geography
Commerce
Rural Development
PG Courses:
Department of Life Sciences (Botany and Zoology)
Department of Physics

References

External links
http://www.digboicollege.com/
https://www.digboicollege.edu.in/

Universities and colleges in Assam
Colleges affiliated to Dibrugarh University
Educational institutions established in 1965
1965 establishments in Assam